The Kharkiv tram is part of the public transport system of the second largest city of Ukraine. The tram network is built almost exclusively on the streets of Kharkiv, making it a traditional tram system. The network consists almost exclusively of double track. In most parts the tracks are separated from other road traffic, whereas elsewhere tracks lie on lanes that cars and buses may also use.

History
The first 12 carriages, in 1906, were built at Maschinenfabrik Augsburg-Nürnberg AG.

Current times
In October 2016, extensive sections of the track are in poor condition, even unsafe. Speeds are low.

In October 2018, the line beyond Children's Park was back in service, though the track is in poor condition, especially at the  balloon loops at the terminus and Children's Park. The line through the city center - previously unused except for specials - now sees regular services, but the line from near Children's Park past the cemetery and down to the valley is not in service. The line to the station is in bad condition. A section between the station and the river has been rebuilt, apparently now omitting any connections to former car barns and/or workshops.

In October 2021 the Stadler Metelitsa tram was making test runs on the Kharkiv tram system. On 24 September 2021 acting mayor of Kharkiv Ihor Terekhov stated that his city's tram fleet would be completely renewed in four years.

Following the start of the ongoing Russian assault on Kharkiv since February 24th, 2022 in the invasion of Ukraine all traffic has been suspended on February 28. The tram depot in Saltivka has been destroyed by Russian bombardment early in March. On May 4 the City Council announced it will be impossible to restore the system as all electrical substations and rolling stock have been destroyed by the enemy.

A number of European cities, including Brno, Ostrava and Prague, have offered to donate surplus tram cars for restoration of the system.

On May 19, 2022, Kharkiv Mayor Ihor Terekhov announced that four light rail lines would restart service, due to the improving security situation in the city.

See also 

 Kharkiv Metro
 Kharkiv railway station

References

External links

Tram transport in Ukraine
Transport in Kharkiv
Kharkiv
1906 establishments in Ukraine